John Solomon (born 15 June 1928) is a former  Australian rules footballer who played with St Kilda in the Victorian Football League (VFL).

Notes

External links 

Possibly living people
1928 births
Australian rules footballers from Victoria (Australia)
St Kilda Football Club players